The Katō Takaaki Cabinet is the 24th Cabinet of Japan led by Katō Takaaki from June 11, 1924 to January 28, 1926.

Cabinet

Reshuffled Cabinet 
A Cabinet reshuffle took place on August 2, 1925.

Following Katō's death on January 28, 1926, Wakatsuki Reijirō became acting Prime Minister from January 28 to 30, 1926.

References 

Cabinet of Japan
1924 establishments in Japan
Cabinets established in 1924
Cabinets disestablished in 1926